Interwar unemployment and poverty in the United Kingdom describes a period of poverty in Interwar Britain between the end of the First World War in 1918 and the start of the Second World War in 1939. Unemployment was the dominant issue of British society during the interwar years. Unemployment levels rarely dipped below 1,000,000 and reached a peak of more than 3,000,000 in 1933, a figure which represented more than 20% of the working population. The unemployment rate was even higher in areas including South Wales and Liverpool. The Government extended unemployment insurance schemes in 1920 to alleviate the effects of unemployment.

Causes
There were several reasons for the decline in industry after the First World War. The end of the war brought a boom. In the shipping industry, businesses expanded rapidly in order to take advantage of the increase in demand. However, the boom was short-lived and this rapid expansion caused a slump from oversupply. Structural weaknesses in the British economy meant a disproportionate number of jobs were in the traditional industries. A combination of a lack of pre-war technological development and post-war competition damaged the economy and the new industries which emerged employed fewer people. At the same time, Britain began to lose its overseas markets due to strong foreign competition. Some have argued that an overly generous unemployment insurance system worsened the state of the economy. The Wall Street Crash in 1929 was responsible for a worldwide downturn in trade and led to the Great Depression.

Apart from the major pockets of unemployment, Britain was generally prosperous. Historian Piers Brendon writes:
Historians, however, have long since revised this grim picture, presenting the devil's decade as the cradle of the affluent society. Prices fell sharply between the wars and average incomes rose by about a third. The term "property-owning democracy" was coined in the 1920s, and 3,000,000 houses were built during the 1930s. Land, labour and materials were cheap: a bungalow could be purchased for £225 and a semi for £450. The middle-class also bought radiograms, telephones, three-piece suites, electric cookers, vacuum cleaners and golf clubs. They ate Kellogg's Corn Flakes ("never miss a day"), drove to Odeon cinemas in Austin Sevens (costing £135 by 1930) and smoked Craven A cigarettes, cork-tipped "to prevent sore throats". The depression spawned a consumer boom.

Response

Lloyd George's coalition
As the Government had funded the Great War largely through borrowing, Britain had run up a large national debt. A boom in the economy occurred in 1919 causing unemployment rates to decrease. The boom stopped in 1920 when unemployment began to increase, by the time that the Liberal-Conservative coalition lost power at the 1922 general election, the unemployment rate had reached 2,500,000. A committee on unemployment was set up in 1920 and recommended public work schemes to ease unemployment, this led to the establishment of the Unemployment Grants Committee. As unemployment was not uniform across Britain, it was decided to concentrate schemes in areas of the country that were particularly affected by the economic downturn. However, the government wished, also, to return to the gold standard, a move which would have required cuts in public spending. The Unemployment Insurance Act 1920 extended unemployment benefits to cover all workers who earned less than £250. The "Seeking Work Test" was introduced in 1921, it stated to receive full unemployment benefit there had to be evidence the recipient was looking for work.

Conservative policy
The Unemployment Insurance Act 1927 returned to the principle that workers had to contribute to insurance schemes in order to be a part of them. The workhouse system was abolished and replaced with a system of Public Assistance Committees.

Labour Policy
Ramsay MacDonald's Government passed the Development (Loan Guarantees and Grants) Act 1929.

National Government
In 1931, a National Government formed after Cabinet splits resulting from the financial crisis. National Governments would stay in power from 1931-1940 until Winston Churchill became Prime Minister of a Coalition Government during the Second World War.

Local government was reorganised so that local authorities provided school dinners and health services, means testing was introduced and the Unemployment Assistance Board was set up in 1934. Economic measures included the devaluation of the pound and taking Britain's currency off of the gold standard, borrowing also increased. The Special Areas Act 1934 attempted to inject finance into depressed areas and British industry was protected by protectionist measures such as state subsidies and import quotas. The Unemployment Act 1934 increased the numbers covered by unemployment insurance.

Legislation

Unemployment Insurance Act 1920
Unemployment Insurance Act 1921
Unemployment Insurance Act 1924
Unemployment Insurance Act 1927
Unemployment Insurance Act 1930
Coal Mines Act 1930
Import Duties Act 1932
Unemployment Act 1934
Special Areas Act 1934
British Shipping (Assistance) Act 1935
Cotton Industry (Reorgainsation) Act 1936
Special Areas (Amendment) Act 1937
Cotton Industry (Reorgainsation) Act 1939

Unrest
There were several examples of unrest during this period, most notably the General Strike of 1926 and the Jarrow March of October 1936. There were also protests against the introduction of means testing and hunger marches organized by the National Unemployed Workers Movement.

References

Further reading
  Benjamin, Daniel K. & Levis A. Kochin, "Searching for an Explanation for Unemployment in Interwar Britain" Journal of Political Economy 87 (1979), pp. 441-478.
 Cole, Harold L., and Lee E. Ohanian. "The Great UK Depression: A puzzle and possible resolution." Review of Economic Dynamics 5.1 (2002): 19-44.
 Eichengreen, Barry J., and Timothy J. Hatton, eds. Interwar unemployment in international perspective (Springer, 2012).
 Eichengreen, Barry. "Unemployment in Interwar Britain." Institute for Research on Labor and Employment (1988). online
 Hatton, Timothy J. "Unemployment and the labour market, 1870-1939." in The Cambridge economic history of modern Britain: vol 2 1860-1939 (2004)
 Hatton, Timothy J., and Roy E. Bailey. "Unemployment incidence in interwar London." Economica 69.276 (2002): 631-654.
 McKibbin, Ross. Classes and Cultures: England 1918-1951 (2000) pp 111-26.
 Pugh, Martin.  'We Danced All Night': A Social History of Britain Between the Wars (2008) review by Piers Brendon in The Guardian 4 July 2008
 Srinivasan, Naveen, and Pratik Mitra. "Interwar Unemployment in the UK and the US: Old and New Evidence." South Asian Journal of Macroeconomics and Public Finance 5.1 (2016): 96-112. online

External links
Unemployment in interwar Britain

Poverty in the United Kingdom
Poor Law in Britain and Ireland
20th century in the United Kingdom
Unemployment in the United Kingdom
Interwar Britain